High on the Hog is the most commercially successful album by the southern rock band Black Oak Arkansas. It is mainly known for its cover of the LaVern Baker song "Jim Dandy", which reached number 25 on the Billboard Hot 100. The album prominently featured southern electric guitar licks and James Mangrum's scratchy, hillbilly vocals.

Critical reception 
On AllMusic, Donald A. Guarisco wrote "["Jim Dandy"] is definitely High on the Hogs undisputed highlight, but the other tracks surrounding it also have plenty to offer. Although they were too eccentric a band to fit a strict "Southern rock" label à la Lynyrd Skynyrd, Black Oak Arkansas did have an ability to dish up both country and rock sounds with style.... [T]he group also shows a surprising ability to mix elements of pure funk into their country-rock stew..."

Track listing 
All songs by Black Oak Arkansas, except "Jim Dandy" by Lincoln Chase and "Moonshine Sonata" by Black Oak Arkansas & Tom Dowd.

"Swimmin' in Quicksand" - 3:20
"Back to the Land" - 2:25
"Movin'" - 3:13
"Happy Hooker" - 5:27
"Red Hot Lovin'" - 2:45
"Jim Dandy" - 2:38
"Moonshine Sonata" - 5:26
"Why Shouldn't I Smile" - 2:21
"High 'n' Dry" - 2:25
"Mad Man" - 3:50

Personnel
Black Oak Arkansas
Jim "Dandy" Mangrum - vocals
Harvey Jett - guitars
Stanley Knight - guitars
Rick Reynolds - guitars
Pat Daugherty - bass
Tommy Aldridge - drums
Additional musicians
Ruby Starr - backing vocals on "Jim Dandy"
Production
Tom Dowd - producer
Ron & Howie Albert - engineers on tracks 3, 9, 10
Ed Barton - engineer on the other tracks
Joe Petagno - album illustration

Charts
Album - Billboard (United States)
RPM (Canada)

Singles - Billboard (United States)
RPM (Canada)

References

1973 albums
Black Oak Arkansas albums
Albums produced by Tom Dowd
Atco Records albums
Albums with cover art by Joe Petagno